Porphyromonas catoniae  is a Gram-negative and anaerobic bacterium from the genus of Porphyromonas which has been isolated from the human gingival crevice.

References 

Bacteroidia
Bacteria described in 1994